Takeo Yazawa-Hoshina (12 October 1906 – 7 October 1983) was a Japanese cross-country skier. He competed at the 1928 Winter Olympics and the 1932 Winter Olympics.

References

1906 births
Year of death missing
Japanese male cross-country skiers
Olympic cross-country skiers of Japan
Cross-country skiers at the 1928 Winter Olympics
Cross-country skiers at the 1932 Winter Olympics
Sportspeople from Niigata Prefecture